The 1964–65 St. John's Redmen basketball team represented St. John's University during the 1964–65 NCAA Division I college basketball season. The team was coached by Joseph Lapchick in his twentieth and final year at the school. St. John's was an independent and played their home games at Alumni Hall in Queens, NY and Madison Square Garden in Manhattan.

Roster

Schedule and results

|-
!colspan=9 style="background:#FF0000; color:#FFFFFF;"| Regular Season

|-
!colspan=9 style="background:#FF0000; color:#FFFFFF;"| NIT

Team players drafted into the NBA

References

St. John's Red Storm men's basketball seasons
St. John's
St. John's
National Invitation Tournament championship seasons
1964 in sports in New York City
St John